Silent Planet is an American metalcore band formed in Azusa, California, in 2009.  Their name is derived from C. S. Lewis' science fiction novel Out of the Silent Planet. The group consists of vocalist Garrett Russell, guitarist Mitchell Stark, bassist Thomas Freckleton and drummer Alex Camarena. They are currently signed to Solid State Records and have released four studio albums. Their latest studio album, Iridescent, was released on November 12, 2021.

History

Formation, line-up changes and first releases (2009–2014)
Before finalizing the line-up for Come Wind, Come Weather, Silent Planet held practices in the Azusa Pacific University music building. They shared practice sessions with fellow hardcore band Hepafilter, in which Russell was also the lead vocalist. Russell recorded an EP titled Coward with Hepafilter and toured with them until the group disbanded in late 2011.

In 2012, the band recorded their first EP Come Wind, Come Weather in Atlanta, Georgia with producer Matt Goldman, which they released on May 15, 2012. Afterwards, the group toured with bands such as Becoming the Archetype, I, of Helix and Dayseeker while also played at California Metalfest 2012.

On February 14, 2013, Silent Planet released the song "Tiny Hands (Au Revoir)", which tells the story of Marguerite Rouffanche, survivor of the Oradour-sur-Glane massacre, an event that happened  on June 10, 1944 during the Second World War. They continued touring and played on the Scream the Prayer Tour with bands like Wolves at the Gate and Fit for a King. On July 23, the band unveiled "Darkstrand (Hibakusha)", which, like "Tiny Hands (Au Revoir)", also tells the story of a World War II victim; this time the story is set in Japan just after the impact of the atomic bomb on Hiroshima.

On January 2, 2014, their five-track EP lastsleep (1944–1946), which is based on the stories of World War II victims, was released. It contains the two songs released in 2013 along with "Wasteland (Vechnost)", and two instrumentals. Later that year, they went on tour with bands such as Sleeping Giant, This or the Apocalypse, Phinehas, Those Who Fear, Lionfight and The Ongoing Concept.

The Night God Slept (2014–2015)
On May 17, 2014, Silent Planet unveiled that they completed their debut studio album. On July 13, band members also stated that the album is set to be released in fall 2014 through "an artist-friendly record label who is allowing [them] to retain full creative control." On September 14, the band revealed the release date of their record to be November 10, 2014. On September 19, they dropped a hint pointing towards the name of the album on their Facebook page.

On September 23, it was announced that their debut studio album, The Night God Slept, would be released through Solid State Records. The group then released some new songs from the record to their Facebook page, starting with "XX (City Grave)" on September 30, followed by "Native Blood" on October 23, "Firstwake" on November 2 and "Depths II" on November 5. On September 30, 2015, Efimov announced his departure from the band.

Everything Was Sound (2016–2017)
On April 27, 2016, Silent Planet announced on Vans Warped Tour their second studio album, Everything Was Sound, which was released on July 1, 2016. The band released three singles from the record with two of them are accompanying with music videos. "Panic Room" was available on May 12. "Psychescape", featuring Spencer Chamberlain of Underoath, was streaming on June 2. The third and final single, "Orphan", was unveiled on June 17.

On October 26, it was revealed that drummer Alex Camarena has formed a side-project called Nothing Left along with brothers Brandon and Ryan Leitru, formerly from the band For Today. The project also comprises Danon Saylor, the former vocalist of A Bullet for Pretty Boy and Devin Henderson of Take It Back!. They are planning to release new music by the end of the year through Nuclear Blast.

When the End Began (2018–2019)
On June 15, 2018, Silent Planet released "Northern Fires (Guernica)", which revolves around the Spanish Civil War. On July 17, they unveiled another single titled "Vanity of Sleep", which revolves around modern consumer despair. On August 7, the band announced their third studio album, When the End Began, which was released on November 2, 2018.

On August 17, the third single, "Share the Body", was available with a corresponding music video. On September 14, the group was streaming the fourth single "In Absence". On October 19, one month before the album release, the fifth and final single of the album ,"The New Eternity", came out. On August 18, 2019, the band released an additional song, "Shark Week", a B-side from this album's sessions.

Iridescent (2020–present)
On January 24, 2020, Silent Planet released The Night God Slept Redux, a re-recorded edition of their debut album. On February 14, the band released "Trilogy", a single that focuses and revolves around vocalist Garrett Russell's stay in a mental hospital in which he wrote the lyrics in one sitting. On April 17, the band released the instrumental edition of the recent redux of The Night God Slept. On April 24, they released the instrumental edition of Everything Was Sound. On May 1, they released the instrumental edition of When the End Began.

On March 23, 2021, band members officially announced the new fourth album is completed. On April 9, after unveiling some artworks the prior couple days, they announced during the global COVID-19 pandemic a surprise collaboration with Fit for a King. The collaboration included both bands' vocalists being featured on reworked version of their recent tracks and both bands will also release a limited merch line to promote the collaboration.

On August 20, the group surprise released a brand new single "Panopticon". On September 17, Silent Planet officially unveiled the third single "Terminal" along with its music video. At the same time, the band revealed that their upcoming fourth album would be entitled Iridescent, with a release date of November 12, 2021, along with the cover and track list of the album. To promote the album, they also announced that they will support Motionless in White's rescheduled U.S. tour along with Light the Torch and Dying Wish which has started in May 2021. On October 22, one month before the album release, the group debuted the fourth single "Anhedonia". On July 22, 2022, the band's brand new single, ":Signal:", was debuted.

Musical style and influences
Musically, Silent Planet has been described as metalcore, and more specifically, progressive metalcore. They are known for their intricate sound and incorporation of post-rock textures. The band has also been noted for their thought-provoking lyrics, which cover topics such as war, psychology, religion, and politics. They have sometimes been labeled as Christian metal, due to their use of biblical references and the band members' faith, though they incorporate non-religious themes and references as well. Russell cites songs such as "No Place to Breathe" (in support of Black Lives Matter) and "Alive, as a Housefire" (confronting the ideological divide in the United States of America) as explicit statements of the band's political beliefs.

Band members have listed Oh, Sleeper, Architects, Underoath, and This Will Destroy You as influences on their sound.

Members

Current
 Garrett Russell – lead vocals, guitars (2020–present); unclean vocals (2009–2020) 
 Thomas Freckleton – bass, keyboards, clean vocals (2013–present)
 Mitchell Stark – guitars (2013–present); clean vocals (2020–present)
 Alex Camarena – drums (2013–present)

Former
 Nick Marshall – guitars, clean vocals (2009–2010)
 David "Ducky" Belvin – guitars (2009–2010)
 Jay Learue – bass (2009–2010)
 Jason Scribner – drums (2009–2010)
 Nathan Benedict – guitars (2009–2013); bass (2010–2011)
 Garrett Lemster – bass (2011–2013)
 Ryan Whittington – guitars (2011–2013)
 Teddy Ramirez – drums (2010–2013)
 Igor Efimov – guitars (2013–2015)
 Spencer Keene – guitars (2011–2016)

Timeline

Discography
Studio albums

EPs
 Come Wind, Come Weather (2012)
 lastsleep (1944–1946) (2014)

References

External Links
 

American Christian metal musical groups
Metalcore musical groups from California
Musical groups established in 2009
2009 establishments in California
Solid State Records artists